Finance Norway is the industry organisation for the financial industry in Norway. Finance Norway represents more than 200 financial companies with around 50,000 employees.

It was established on 1 January 2010 as a cooperation organization between the Norwegian Financial Services Association and the Norwegian Savings Banks Association. These organizations still exist, but not their respective "service offices", whose tasks were taken over by Finance Norway.

Idar Kreutzer is managing director at Finans Norge.
The headquarters are at Hansteens gate 2, Oslo.

References

External links

Official site

Employers' organisations in Norway
Organizations established in 2010
Organisations based in Oslo
2010 establishments in Norway
Finance industry associations